Amizour is a town in northern Algeria of the Béjaïa Province.

Communes of Béjaïa Province